Phillips is a ghost town in Hutchinson County, Texas, United States. It was founded as Pantex, Texas. In 1938, Pantex and Whittenburg combined and renamed as Phillips for the dominant employer, the Phillips Petroleum Company, by a vote of the people.

American actress Mary Castle lived in Phillips as a girl and attended junior high school there.

State Senator and former president of West Texas A&M University Max Sherman was reared in Phillips and graduated from Phillips High School. Singer/songwriter Russell "Red" Steagall grew up in Sanford and also graduated from Phillips High School.

Past demographics
Maximum population: 4,250 in 1947

Education
It is served by the Plemons-Stinnett-Phillips Consolidated Independent School District.

It was a part of the Phillips Independent School District until July 1, 1987, when it merged into the PSP CISD.

On March 19, 1950, a fire destroyed the high school. Local churches housed classes until the new school was built.

Decreasing population
In the 1950s and 1960s, improved highways and transportation resulted in many businesses and people moving to Borger.
By 1980, the population had dropped to about 2,500.

1980 explosion
A hydrocarbon explosion at the refinery in 1980 obliterated part of the industrial area and some nearby homes. Damages were estimated to be in the millions of dollars. After a long battle between the citizens of Phillips, M&M Cattle Company, and later Phillips 66, the town was permanently closed to residency, at the request of Phillips 66 Oil Company.  The homes themselves were owned, but the land they sat upon was property of two local ranchers who leased the land originally to the company and later to the home owners.  After the explosion, the company purchased the land from the ranches and forced the homeowners to move.   In 1987, three schools and communities, Plemons, Stinnett and Phillips,  created the Plemons-Stinnett-Phillips Consolidated independent School District.  Three mascots, the Plemons Indians, Stinnett Rattlers and the Phillips Blackhawks were changed to create the Comanches.  The campuses of the district, West Texas Elementary School, West Texas Middle School, and West Texas High School are all united as Comanches.  Therefore, many homes were moved to areas nearby (Borger, Stinnett, and Fritch). The homes that were not moved were leveled.

Today, the high school is one of the few buildings left and is used for business by the Phillips 66 Refinery.

References

External links

 TexasEscapes Entry for Phillips, Texas
 Handbook of Texas Online
 Phillips High School Alumni Association
 History of Phillips 66 Refinery in Phillips, Texas

Geography of Hutchinson County, Texas
ConocoPhillips
Company towns in Texas
Populated places established in 1938
Populated places disestablished in 1980
Ghost towns in the Texas Panhandle
1938 establishments in Texas
1980 disestablishments in Texas
Phillips 66